Levinz is a surname, People with that name include:

 Baptist Levinz (before 1660 - 1693), Anglican churchman
 Creswell Levinz (1627–1701), English judge
 Robert Levinz (1615–1650), English Royalist, executed as a spy
 William Levinz (1625-1698), doctor of medicine, Regius Professor of Greek at Oxford University
 William Levinz (MP) ( – 1747)

See also
 Levin (disambiguation)